The following highways are numbered 131:

Canada
 Ontario Highway 131 (former)
 Prince Edward Island Route 131
 Quebec Route 131

Costa Rica
 National Route 131

India
 National Highway 131 (India)

Italy
 State road 131

Japan
 Japan National Route 131

United States
 U.S. Route 131
 Alabama State Route 131
 Arkansas Highway 131
 California State Route 131
 Colorado State Highway 131
 Connecticut Route 131
 Florida State Road 131 (former)
 County Road 131 (Columbia County, Florida)
 Georgia State Route 131 (former)
 Illinois Route 131
 Indiana State Road 131 (former)
 Iowa Highway 131 (former)
 K-131 (Kansas highway)
 Kentucky Route 131
 Louisiana Highway 131
 Maine State Route 131
 Maryland Route 131
 Massachusetts Route 131
 M-131 (Michigan highway) (former)
 Missouri Route 131
 Nebraska Highway 131 (former)
 County Route 131 (Bergen County, New Jersey)
 New Mexico State Road 131
 New York State Route 131
 County Route 131 (Cayuga County, New York)
 County Route 131 (Cortland County, New York)
 County Route 131 (Fulton County, New York)
 County Route 131 (Montgomery County, New York)
 County Route 131 (Niagara County, New York)
 County Route 131 (Onondaga County, New York)
 County Route 131 (Schenectady County, New York)
 County Route 131 (Tompkins County, New York)
 County Route 131 (Westchester County, New York)
 North Carolina Highway 131
 Ohio State Route 131
 Oklahoma State Highway 131
 Oregon Route 131
 Pennsylvania Route 131 (former)
 Tennessee State Route 131
 Texas State Highway 131
 Texas State Highway Spur 131
 Farm to Market Road 131
 Utah State Route 131
 Utah State Route 131 (1933–2001) (former)
 Vermont Route 131
 Virginia State Route 131
 Virginia State Route 131 (1923-1928) (former)
 Virginia State Route 131 (1928-1933) (former)
 Washington State Route 131
 West Virginia Route 131
 Wisconsin Highway 131 
 Wyoming Highway 131

Territories
 Puerto Rico Highway 131